The Proceedings of the Institution of Mechanical Engineers, Part P: Journal of Sports Engineering and Technology is a peer-reviewed scientific journal that covers the development of novel sports apparel, footwear, and equipment; and the materials, instrumentation, and processes that make advances in sports possible. The journal was established in 2008 and is published by SAGE Publications on behalf of the Institution of Mechanical Engineers.

Abstracting and indexing 
The journal is abstracted and indexed in Scopus and the Science Citation Index Expanded. According to the Journal Citation Reports, its 2013 impact factor is 0.615.

References

External links 
 

Engineering journals
English-language journals
Institution of Mechanical Engineers academic journals
Publications established in 2008
Quarterly journals
SAGE Publishing academic journals